ID is the fourth solo studio album by Irish-American singer-songwriter Michael Patrick Kelly. It was released by Columbia Records on June 16, 2017, in German-speaking Europe.

Track listing
All songs written and produced by Kelly, featuring co-production from Fabio Trentini, and Marco Minnemann.

Charts

Weekly charts

Year-end charts

Certifications

References

External links 
 

Michael Patrick Kelly albums
2017 albums
Columbia Records albums